Mi Historia Musical  is a compilation album released by Juan Gabriel on August 26, 2016.

Disc 1

Disc 2

Charts

Weekly charts

Year-end charts

References

2016 compilation albums
Juan Gabriel compilation albums
Spanish-language compilation albums